Tulle Inger Hazelrigg is an American biologist who is Professor of Cell Biology at Columbia University. Her research considers the propagation and differentiation of germ cells. Hazelrigg was the first to attach green fluorescent protein to other proteins, which changed the way biological research could be conducted.

Early life and education 
Hazelrigg was born in Evansville and grew up in Bloomington, Indiana. She is the daughter of Hugh C. and Jane Yde Andersen Hazelrigg. Her father was the head science writer for the Indiana University news bureau. She became interested in science as a child and bred fruit flies in the basement of her house. She was encouraged by her father to complete her science fair projects in the laboratory of Hermann Joseph Muller, Nobel laureate and then geneticist at Indiana University Bloomington. She enrolled at an honorary science academy, but was kicked out because of her involvement in demonstrations against the war in Vietnam. She was an undergraduate student at Oberlin College, where she majored in philosophy. Hazelrigg was unsure what to do after college and worked as a substitute teacher. She moved to Europe where she took courses in art. She eventually returned to the United States and earned her doctorate at Indiana University Bloomington, where she worked under the supervision of Thomas Kaufman. She elucidated the fine structure of the Antennapedia complex. She was a postdoctoral researcher at the Carnegie Institution for Science and University of California, Berkeley.

Research and career 
In 1996 Hazelrigg moved to the University of Utah where she was appointed to the Howard Hughes Medical Institute. Hazelrigg was the first to attach green fluorescent protein to another protein, allowing her to track a protein's movement through living cells using the green fluorescent tag. She showed that the resulting green fluorescent protein fusion protein behaved the same way the untagged protein. Green fluorescent protein fusion proteins allow for the study and localization of proteins in living cells. She joined the faculty at Columbia University in 1992.

Hazelrigg studies the propagation and differentiation of germ cells using the model organism Drosophila. Germ cells undergo a complex differentiation process and become male and female gametes. Hazelrigg has investigated how genes are regulated within the stem cells of germs and how this regulation is impacted by differentiation. She discovered the histone-lysine methyltransferase dSETDB1, which is located in the pericentric heterochromatin and catalyzes the methylation of histone H3 at its K9 residue (H3K9). In the absence of this gene, germline-stem cells are not maintained in adult Drosophila in both the ovaries and the testes. She is investigating the gene targets of dSETDB1 and the mechanisms by which dSETDB1 identifies the targets in the genome.

In September 2019, Hazelrigg and her husband, Martin Chalfie, were awarded honorary degrees from Connecticut College.

Selected publications

Personal life 
In 1989 Hazelrigg married Martin Chalfie. Chalfie was awarded the 2008 Nobel Prize in Chemistry for the discovery and development of green fluorescent protein.

References 

Columbia University faculty
People from Evansville, Indiana
Oberlin College alumni
Indiana University Bloomington alumni
American women biologists
Living people
Year of birth missing (living people)
21st-century American women